Union Bay is located in the Alexander Archipelago within the U.S. state of Alaska. It is situated on the northeast side of Lemesurier Point, the south point at the entrance to Ernest Sound. At its head is a large lagoon, mostly bare at low water, into which empties a large stream. The waters of the bay are deep, but there is anchorage with good protection from southward, on the east side of the head of the bay, in about 18 fathoms.

References

Bibliography

Bays of Alaska
Bodies of water of Wrangell, Alaska